Triodopsis hopetonensis, common name the "Magnolia Threetooth", is a species of air-breathing land snail, terrestrial pulmonate gastropod mollusk in the family Polygyridae.

References

 Jacksonville Shell Club site, images and authority & date, also links to original description

Polygyridae
Gastropods described in 1852